Fannie Brown Patrick (August 29, 1864 - October 8, 1939) was a musician and leader in civic and social affairs.

Early life
Fannie Brown was born in Fairfield, Iowa, on August 29, 1864, the daughter of Isaac Harrington Brown (1822-1901) and Sarah Ellen Fee (1826-1901). She had two siblings: Fred P. Brown (1867-1950) and Prudence M. Harrington (1870-1918).

Career
Fannie Brown Patrick was a music teacher and one of the organizers of the Nevada Musical Club and acted on several occasions as chairman of music week.

She was active in civic work: she was the chairman of the Council of Education of the YWCA; she was past president of the State Federation of Women's Clubs of Nevada; she was trustee and secretary of Southside Irrigating Canal Co.

She was a charter member of the Twentieth Century Club (for which she served several time as secretary and was the club parliamentarian for 20 years) and the State Farm Bureau, and was president of the Hillcrest Chapter of Delphian Society.

She was instrumental in founding a number of Reno institutions. Prominent in politics of the State, Patrick was active for many years in affairs of the Democratic party and she was member of the National Committee woman of the Nevada Democratic Party.

She was a member of the Daughters of the American Revolution, the Trinity Episcopal Church and the Guild Society and other groups.

With her husband, Patrick operated the Patrick ranch near the south city limits of Reno; in the 1930s the land was subdivided and added to the city and Patrick retained the property where their home was located.

She was prominent in the women's suffrage movement in Nevada.

Personal life
Fannie Brown Patrick lived at Fremont, Nebraska and Wood River, Nebraska, and moved to Reno, Nevada, in 1902.

Fannie Brown married Frank Goodwill Patrick (1854-1922) and they had two children: Octa Maude Patrick (1889-1889) and Lloyd B. Patrick (1892-1967).

She died on October 8, 1939, and is buried at Ridge Cemetery, Fremont, in the family plot.

References

1864 births
Daughters of the American Revolution people
1939 deaths
People from Fairfield, Iowa
Clubwomen